Christie Renee Welsh (born February 27, 1981) is an American former soccer player who played as a forward. She previously played for the New York Power of Women's United Soccer Association (WUSA) as well as the Los Angeles Sol, Saint Louis Athletica, and Washington Freedom of Women's Professional Soccer (WPS). She is also a former member of the United States women's national soccer team.

Early life
Born in Massapequa Park, New York, Welsh attended Massapequa High School on Long Island in Massapequa, New York. She was a two-time Parade All-American and a 1999 NSCAA All-American. Welsh was the 1998 Gatorade Circle of Champions National High School Girls' Soccer Player of the Year. She led Massapequa to the 1997 New York State Championship.  Welsh played club soccer with the Northport Cow Harbor Piranha where she won two national titles.

Penn State University
Welsh attended Penn State University and ended her collegiate career as one of the most decorated athletes in the school's history. In her freshman campaign, Welsh piloted the Lions to their first ever Final Four, led the team and was tied nationally for goals scored (27), and earned Penn State's first College Cup all-tournament honor.

Her junior year, Welsh's received the Hermann Trophy, the sport's most prestigious award given to the nation's top player. She was also honored with the 2001 Missouri Athletic Club Player of the Year award. She finished her career amassing four NSCAA All-America honors, three consecutive Soccer America Collegiate MVP's, and three Big Ten Player of the Year honors. She is still the Big Ten's leading scorer and was part of four Big Ten title teams and two College Cup squads during her time at Penn State. Welsh ended her collegiate career at Penn State with 82 goals and 52 assists plus 27 game-winning goals which are all Big 10 records.

Playing career

New York Power 

Welsh was drafted second overall by the New York Power of the now-defunct WUSA professional league. She scored six goals in 12 games during her rookie season.

Los Angeles Sol & Saint Louis Athletica

In 2009, Welsh was selected with the 5th pick of the second round (12th overall) by the Los Angeles Sol in the WPS General Player Draft. She appeared in three games for Los Angeles before being traded to the Saint Louis Athletica on May 9, 2009. She finished the 2009 season with three goals in 11 games for St. Louis.

Washington Freedom
Welsh was acquired by the Washington Freedom before the start of the 2010 season.

D.C. United
After the Freedom was moved to Florida under new ownership for the 2011 season, Welsh joined D.C. United Women originally as an assistant coach, but has attained a second role as a substitute forward.

International
Amidst top U.S. players out for wage boycotts after their 1999 World Cup the national team called up the Nittany Lion striker for the Australian Cup. In January 2000 Welsh made her National Team debut scoring against the Czech Republic in a 8-1 rout in Melbourne, Australia. Welsh took a leave of absence from school and college soccer to establish a residency with the United States Women's National Team in Florida to train.

Welsh scored 11 goals in 15 games for the United States in her first significant season with the full national team.  She scored 10 goals faster than any other player in American soccer history.  In 2004, Welsh was a member of the U.S. Olympic Residency Training Camp.  In 2005, Welsh won the Golden Boot Award as top scorer in the prestigious Algarve Cup tournament with five goals, including the game-winning goal in the championship match against Germany.

Coaching career
Welsh is currently an assistant coach at University of Oregon. She previously served as a volunteer assistant coach for Penn State from 2004–2006 and Wisconsin in 2011. She is also head coach and director of the U16 FC Bucks Revolution club team.

See also
List of Pennsylvania State University Olympians

References

External links
 
 US Soccer player profile
 Washington Freedom player profile
 New Jersey Wildcats player profile

Washington Freedom players
Los Angeles Sol players
Saint Louis Athletica players
Parade High School All-Americans (girls' soccer)
Penn State Nittany Lions women's soccer players
1981 births
Living people
Expatriate women's footballers in France
Olympique Lyonnais Féminin players
Expatriate women's footballers in Sweden
USL W-League (1995–2015) players
D.C. United Women players
New York Power players
People from Massapequa, New York
People from Massapequa Park, New York
Damallsvenskan players
KIF Örebro DFF players
American expatriate sportspeople in Sweden
American expatriates in France
New Jersey Wildcats players
Division 1 Féminine players
Women's association football forwards
American women's soccer players
Hermann Trophy women's winners
Massapequa High School alumni
United States women's international soccer players
Big Ten Athlete of the Year winners
Hampton Roads Piranhas players
Women's Professional Soccer players
Long Island Rough Riders (USL W League) players
Penn State Nittany Lions women's soccer coaches
Wisconsin Badgers women's soccer coaches
Saint Joseph's Hawks coaches
Saint Joseph's Hawks soccer
Oregon Ducks women's soccer coaches
High school soccer coaches in the United States
Women's United Soccer Association players